The 2018–19 LEN Euro League Women was the 32nd edition of the major European tournament for women's water polo clubs. It ran from 24 January to 20 April 2019.

The Final 4 was contested in Sabadell, Spain, on 19 and 20 April. The home team became European champion for the fifth time, defeating Greece's Olympiacos in the final match.

Overview

Calendar
The calendar of the competition was announced on 25 May 2018.

‡:

Participating teams

Preliminary round
The draw of the pools for the preliminary round was held in Kirishi, Russia, before the 2018 Super Cup, on 9 october 2018.

Pools composition

Group A
Venue: Piscina Pere Serrat, Barcelona, Spain.

Group B
Venue: Mestská Krytá Plaváreň, Košice, Slovakia.

Group C
Venue: Centro Sportivo del Plebiscito, Padua, Italy.

Group D
Venue: Petros Kapagerov National Swimming Hall, Piraeus, Greece.

†

Knockout stage

Quarterfinals
The draw took place at LEN headquarters in Nyon, Switzerland, on 29 January 2019.

|}

First Leg

Second Leg

Final Four
The allocation of the final 4 in Sabadell and the draw of the semifinals were announced by LEN on 13 March 2019. The Spanish team hosted the finals for the second time (the first one was the 2016 edition).

Semifinals

Finals
3rd place

1st place

Final standings

See also
 2018–19 LEN Champions League
 2018–19 Women's LEN Trophy

References

External links
Official LEN website
Microplustiming (Official results website)

LEN Euro League Women seasons
Women, Euro League
E
E